The men's team regu sepak takraw competition at the 2006 Asian Games in Doha was held from 2 December to 6 December at the Al-Sadd Indoor Hall.

Squads

Results 
All times are Arabia Standard Time (UTC+03:00)

Preliminary

Group A

|-
|rowspan=2|2 December||rowspan=2|09:00
|rowspan=2 align=right|
|rowspan=2 align=center|1–2
|rowspan=2 align=left|
|colspan=3|0–2||colspan=3|0–2||colspan=3|2–1
|-
|14–21||17–21|| ||13–21||17–21|| ||21–18||19–21||15–12
|-
|rowspan=2|3 December||rowspan=2|09:00
|rowspan=2 align=right|
|rowspan=2 align=center|3–0
|rowspan=2 align=left|
|colspan=3|2–0||colspan=3|2–0||colspan=3|2–0
|-
|21–11||21–12|| ||21–14||21–10|| ||21–16||21–11||
|-
|rowspan=2|4 December||rowspan=2|09:00
|rowspan=2 align=right|
|rowspan=2 align=center|3–0
|rowspan=2 align=left|
|colspan=3|2–0||colspan=3|2–0||colspan=3|2–0
|-
|21–12||21–11|| ||21–12||21–10|| ||21–17||21–17||

Group B

|-
|rowspan=2|2 December||rowspan=2|09:00
|rowspan=2 align=right|
|rowspan=2 align=center|3–0
|rowspan=2 align=left|
|colspan=3|2–0||colspan=3|2–0||colspan=3|2–0
|-
|21–7||21–10|| ||21–12||21–7|| ||colspan=3|Walkover
|-
|rowspan=2|2 December||rowspan=2|09:00
|rowspan=2 align=right|
|rowspan=2 align=center|3–0
|rowspan=2 align=left|
|colspan=3|2–0||colspan=3|2–0||colspan=3|2–0
|-
|21–17||21–19|| ||21–17||21–15|| ||21–12||21–12||
|-
|rowspan=2|3 December||rowspan=2|09:00
|rowspan=2 align=right|
|rowspan=2 align=center|3–0
|rowspan=2 align=left|
|colspan=3|2–0||colspan=3|2–0||colspan=3|2–0
|-
|21–16||21–13|| ||21–14||21–8|| ||21–14||21–12||
|-
|rowspan=2|3 December||rowspan=2|09:00
|rowspan=2 align=right|
|rowspan=2 align=center|3–0
|rowspan=2 align=left|
|colspan=3|2–0||colspan=3|2–0||colspan=3|2–0
|-
|24–22||21–11|| ||21–14||21–18|| ||colspan=3|Walkover
|-
|rowspan=2|4 December||rowspan=2|09:00
|rowspan=2 align=right|
|rowspan=2 align=center|1–2
|rowspan=2 align=left|
|colspan=3|2–0||colspan=3|0–2||colspan=3|0–2
|-
|21–19||21–18|| ||6–21||12–21|| ||16–21||13–21|| 
|-
|rowspan=2|4 December||rowspan=2|09:00
|rowspan=2 align=right|
|rowspan=2 align=center|3–0
|rowspan=2 align=left|
|colspan=3|2–0||colspan=3|2–0||colspan=3|2–1
|-
|21–6||21–17|| ||21–10||21–18|| ||21–9||19–21||15–8

Knockout round

Semifinals

|-
|rowspan=2|5 December||rowspan=2|15:00
|rowspan=2 align=right|
|rowspan=2 align=center|3–0
|rowspan=2 align=left|
|colspan=3|2–0||colspan=3|2–0||colspan=3|2–0
|-
|21–13||21–12|| ||21–12||21–14|| ||colspan=3|Walkover
|-
|rowspan=2|5 December||rowspan=2|18:00
|rowspan=2 align=right|
|rowspan=2 align=center|3–0
|rowspan=2 align=left|
|colspan=3|2–0||colspan=3|2–0||colspan=3|2–0
|-
|21–9||21–11|| ||21–16||21–16|| ||21–17||21–13||

Final

|-
|rowspan=2|6 December||rowspan=2|16:00
|rowspan=2 align=right|
|rowspan=2 align=center|2–0
|rowspan=2 align=left|
|colspan=3|2–0||colspan=3|2–0||colspan=3|
|-
|21–15||21–15|| ||22–20||21–12|| || || ||

References 

Official Website
Results
Squads

Sepak takraw at the 2006 Asian Games